A list of films produced in the Soviet Union between 1917 and 1921:

1917

1918

1919

1920

1921



1917-1929
Lists of 1910s films
Films
Lists of 1920s films